Tyreek Hill (born March 1, 1994) is an American football wide receiver for the Miami Dolphins of the National Football League (NFL). Hill was drafted by the Kansas City Chiefs in the fifth round of the 2016 NFL Draft. He played college football at Garden City Community College, Oklahoma State, and West Alabama.

Hill was primarily a return specialist as a rookie but has transitioned to strictly playing wide receiver. Following his rookie year, he received the nickname "Cheetah" in reference to his speed. He has been selected to the Pro Bowl in each of his seven seasons in the league, won Super Bowl LIV with the Chiefs, and was named to the NFL 2010s All-Decade Team as a punt returner.

Early life 
A native of Douglas, Georgia, Hill attended Coffee High School, where he won both the 100 meters and 200 meters at the 2012 Georgia 5A state meet.

On May 26, 2012, at the 36th Golden South Classic in Orlando, Florida, Hill ran a new season-best in the 100 m (10.19 s) and a personal record in the 200 m (20.14 s). His time in the 200 m missed Roy Martin's 1985 national high school record by only one hundredth of a second. Hill's mark was the fastest time by a junior athlete in the 2012 season and the fastest by a junior athlete since Ramil Guliyev's 20.04 s in 2009. His time in the 100 m ties Abraham Hall for second fastest by a junior in the 2012 season, behind only Adam Gemili. He was Track and Field News "High School Athlete of the Year" in 2012. Hill ran a wind-assisted (+5.0 m/s) 9.98 s in the 100-meter dash at the 2013 Hutchinson NJCCA Championships.

Hill was a USA Today All-American track and field selection in 2012.

 College career 

 Garden City CC 
At Garden City Community College, Hill ran track and played football. As a sophomore in 2013, Hill ran for 659 rushing yards and five touchdowns while catching 67 passes for 532 receiving yards for the Broncbusters football team.

 Oklahoma State 
Coming out of Garden City Community College, Hill was a highly sought-after junior college recruit and chose to attend Oklahoma State University.

On August 30, 2014, Hill made his debut for the Cowboys and caught a season-high six passes for 62 receiving yards in a loss to the Florida State Seminoles. On September 25, 2014, he caught his first career touchdown against the Texas Tech Red Raiders and finished the victory with three receptions for 50 yards, six rushing attempts for 39-yards, and three kick returns for a total of 62 yards. In the following game against the Iowa State Cyclones, Hill finished with a season-high 148 kick-return yards on five attempts and returned his first kick return for a touchdown of the season. On November 1, 2014, he gained a season-high 102 rushing yards on 18 attempts and scored his first rushing touchdown of the season against the Kansas State Wildcats.

On December 6, 2014, he appeared in his last game as a part of Oklahoma State's football team and helped them win a comeback victory over their rival Oklahoma Sooners after he returned a punt for a 92-yard touchdown.

On December 11, 2014, Oklahoma State dismissed Hill from their football and track teams for his domestic violence arrest a few days prior. In his only season at Oklahoma State, Hill had a total of 102 rushing attempts for 534 rushing yards and one touchdown, 31 receptions for 381 receiving yards and a touchdown, 30 kick returns for 740 return yards and two touchdowns, and 27 punt returns for 256 punt return yards and a touchdown. As a running back, wide receiver, and returner, he accounted for 1,811 all-purpose yards and six touchdowns. His 996 combined return yards ranked second in the nation. He was ranked 11th nationally in all-purpose yards.

 West Alabama 
On September 1, 2015, the University of West Alabama announced that Hill enrolled and would play football for the Tigers. West Alabama head coach Brett Gilliland has stated that he initially turned down Hill after he read the police report alleging how he choked and hit his girlfriend. However, after getting to know Hill personally, he spoke to people at Oklahoma State, Hill's former coaches at Garden City Community College, and a high school mentor. He was also swayed by a part of the plea deal that required Hill to either attend school full-time or be employed.

On the field, Hill was utilized very evenly as a running back (25 carries for 237 yards and one touchdown), wide receiver (27 receptions for 444 yards and a touchdown), punt returner (20 returns averaging 10.7 yards with two touchdowns), and kick returner (also 20 returns averaging 23.0 yards with two touchdowns). In his 11 games for the team, he never exceeded 100 yards rushing or receiving, and averaged 135 all-purpose yards until a 307-all-purpose-yard burst against Delta State in Game 8. After this, his production tapered off quickly to a season-ending −3 all-purpose-yards against the North Alabama Lions.

 Professional career 
Hill was projected to be undrafted during the 2016 NFL Draft, mainly due to his domestic violence arrest. Although he was not invited to the NFL Combine, Hill was able to showcase his abilities at West Alabama's Pro Day. Scouts were mainly impressed with his speed and he received much praise for his workout. Regardless of his workout, many teams had completely removed Hill from their draft boards, but his head coach from West Alabama maintained that at least 20 teams were still interested in him.

 Kansas City Chiefs 
The Kansas City Chiefs selected Hill in the fifth round (165th overall) of the 2016 NFL Draft. He was the first player from West Alabama to be drafted since 1974, when Ken Hutcherson was drafted 97th overall by the Dallas Cowboys. The Chiefs were criticized by fans for the selection due to his past issues with domestic violence and the Chiefs' history with former linebacker Jovan Belcher. General Manager John Dorsey had to receive consent from Chiefs' owner Clark Hunt to make the selection and says they thoroughly vetted the prospect which included speaking to the prosecutor that charged him. After drafting him, the Chiefs' held an impromptu press conference and addressed the issue to the media during the first day of rookie minicamp.

 2016 

On May 17, 2016, the Chiefs signed Hill to a four-year, $2.58 million contract that included $100,000 guaranteed and a signing bonus of $70,000.

Hill began the 2016 season as the Chiefs' starting punt returner, kick returner, and their fourth wide receiver on their depth chart behind veterans Jeremy Maclin, Chris Conley, and Albert Wilson. In the Kansas City Chiefs' season-opener, he made his first NFL catch for a nine-yard touchdown pass from Alex Smith as the Chiefs came back from being down 21–3 to defeat the San Diego Chargers 33–27 in overtime.

During Week 8, Hill caught five passes for a season-high 98 yards and a touchdown during a 30–14 road victory over the Indianapolis Colts. Two weeks later, he had a season-high ten catches for 89 yards, helping the Chiefs come back from a 17–0 deficit and defeat the Carolina Panthers by a score of 20–17.

During a Week 12 30–27 overtime road victory against the Denver Broncos, Hill returned a kickoff for an 86-yard touchdown, ran for a three-yard touchdown, and caught a three-yard touchdown pass with less than five seconds left in the fourth quarter. He was the first player with a kick return for a touchdown, rushing touchdown, and receiving touchdown in a single game since Gale Sayers did so for the Chicago Bears in 1965. His performance earned him AFC Offensive Player of the Week.

During Week 14, Hill returned a punt against the Oakland Raiders for a 78-yard touchdown and caught six receptions for 66 yards and scored on a 36-yard touchdown reception, helping the Chiefs win 21–13 on Thursday Night Football and move to first place in the AFC West. He was named AFC Special Teams Player of the Week for his performance in Week 14. Two weeks later against the Broncos, Hill had a season-high six carries for 95 rushing yards and scored a 70-yard rushing touchdown in a 33–10 victory. In the regular-season finale, he caught five passes for 46 receiving yards, had three carries for 15 rushing yards, and a 95-yard punt return for a touchdown in a 37–27 win over the Chargers. His performance against the Chargers earned him his second AFC Special Teams Player of the Week honor.

Hill finished his rookie season with 61 receptions for 593 receiving yards and six touchdowns, 24 carries for 267 rushing yards and three rushing touchdowns, 14 kick returns for a total of 384 yards and a touchdown, and 39 punt returns for 592 yards and two touchdowns. His punt return yards, touchdowns, and 15.2 yards per return average all ranked first in the NFL. He also appeared in all 16 games, had one start, and made seven combined tackles. He was named to the 2017 Pro Bowl as a return specialist. On January 6, 2017, Hill was named First-team All-Pro as a punt returner. He was named to the NFL All-Rookie Team for the 2016 season. Hill was ranked 36th by his fellow players on the NFL Top 100 Players of 2017.

 2017 

On September 7, 2017, in the season opener on Thursday Night Football against the defending Super Bowl champion, the New England Patriots, Hill finished with a career-high 133 receiving yards on seven receptions, which included a 75-yard reception for a touchdown, as the Chiefs won on the road by a score of 42–27. In Week 5, against the Houston Texans, he recorded an 82-yard punt return touchdown in the fourth quarter. During Week 8 against the Denver Broncos on Monday Night Football, Hill threw the first interception of the Chiefs' season on a failed trick play. In the next game against the Dallas Cowboys, he scored a 56-yard touchdown pass from Alex Smith on an unconventional end-of-half play. The Chiefs lined up like they were going to try a Hail Mary and Smith threw an underneath check-down pass to Hill who had a convoy of blockers clear enough space for him to maneuver to the end zone for the once-in-a-lifetime touchdown. During Week 13 against the New York Jets, Hill had 185 receiving yards on six receptions and two touchdowns, which included a 79-yard touchdown, but the Chiefs lost on the road by a score of 31–38. On December 19, 2017, Hill was named to his second Pro Bowl as a return specialist.

Hill finished his second professional season with 75 receptions for 1,183 yards and seven touchdowns. In addition, he had 25 punt returns for 204 net yards and a return touchdown.

The Chiefs finished the 2017 season atop the AFC West with a 10–6 record and made the playoffs. In the narrow 22–21 loss to the Tennessee Titans in the Wild Card Round, Hill finished with seven receptions for 87 yards and a 14-yard rush. He was selected to his second straight Pro Bowl as a return specialist for the AFC. Hill was ranked 40th by his fellow players on the NFL Top 100 Players of 2018.

 2018 

During Week 1 against the Los Angeles Chargers, Hill returned his first touch, a punt return, 91 yards for a touchdown. He also had 169 receiving yards and two touchdowns as the Chiefs won 38–28. In the game, he hauled in a 58-yard touchdown pass, his 13th-career touchdown of over 50 yards. For the second time in his NFL career, he recorded three touchdowns in a single game. In the next game, he caught five passes for 90 yards and another touchdown against the Pittsburgh Steelers. After three less-impressive games, Hill again recorded three receiving touchdowns on seven receptions for 142 yards against the New England Patriots during a Week 6 43–40 road loss. Four weeks later, Hill had his third 100-yard receiving game, with seven receptions for 117 yards and two touchdowns, along with a 20-yard rush, in a Week 10 victory over the Arizona Cardinals. In the next game on Monday Night Football, Hill recorded 10 catches for a career-high 215 yards (and the most by any NFL receiver at that point in the season) and two touchdowns in a 54–51 road loss to the Los Angeles Rams.

Hill finished the season with a career-high 87 receptions for 1,479 yards and 12 touchdowns. He finished second on the team in receptions behind Travis Kelce and led the team in receiving yards and touchdowns. He also finished fourth in the league in receiving yards and touchdowns, and led the league in 20+ and 40+ yard receptions. He was named to his third straight Pro Bowl and was named first-team All-Pro in the "flex" position and second-team All-Pro as a wide receiver. In the Divisional Round against the Indianapolis Colts, he had eight receptions for 72 receiving yards to go along with a 36-yard rushing touchdown in the 31–13 victory. In the AFC Championship, he had a single reception for 42 yards in the 37–31 overtime loss to the New England Patriots.  He was ranked 19th by his fellow players on the NFL Top 100 Players of 2019.

 2019: Super Bowl Championship 

On April 26, 2019, Chiefs general manager Brett Veach announced that Hill was suspended from team activities as a result of the ongoing child abuse investigation. The NFL announced on July 19 that he will not be disciplined for the investigation because the league felt he did not violate the personal conduct policy. On September 6, 2019, Hill signed a three-year, $54 million extension.

In the season opener against the Jacksonville Jaguars, Hill injured his shoulder. He was taken to the hospital as a precaution. Later in the day, it was revealed he had a posteriorly dislocated sternoclavicular joint and would "miss some time". Hill made his return from injury during Week 6 against the Houston Texans. In the game, he caught five passes for 80 yards and two touchdowns in the 31–24 loss. In the next game against the Denver Broncos, Hill finished with 74 receiving yards, including a 57-yard touchdown as the Chiefs won on the road by a score of 30–6. Six days later, he was fined $10,527 for flashing his signature peace sign as he jogged in for the touchdown in the previous game. During Week 9 against the Minnesota Vikings, Hill caught six passes for 140 yards and a touchdown in a narrow 26–23 victory. This was Hill's first game of the season with at least 100 receiving yards. In the next game against the Tennessee Titans, Hill finished with 11 catches for 157 yards and a touchdown as the Chiefs lost on the road by a score of 32–35. Overall, Hill finished the 2019 season with 58 receptions for 860 receiving yards and seven receiving touchdowns. He earned a fourth career nomination to the Pro Bowl following the 2019 season.

The Chiefs finished with a 12–4 record, won the AFC West, and earned a first-round bye. In the Divisional Round against the Houston Texans, he had three receptions for 41 receiving yards in the 51–31 victory. In the AFC Championship against the Titans, Hill caught five passes for 67 yards and two touchdowns during the 35–24 win. Two weeks later in Super Bowl LIV against the San Francisco 49ers, Hill caught nine passes for 105 yards, including a 44-yard catch on 3rd and 15 that sparked the Chiefs comeback enroute to the 31–20 victory.  He was ranked 22nd by his fellow players on the NFL Top 100 Players of 2020.

 2020: Second Super Bowl appearance 

Hill started the 2020 season with four consecutive games recording a receiving touchdown. In Week 12 against the Tampa Bay Buccaneers, Hill finished the game with 13 catches for a career-high 269 yards and three touchdowns during the 27–24 victory. He became the first player since Lee Evans in 2006 to record at least 200 receiving yards in a single quarter.
Hill was named the AFC Offensive Player of the Week for his performance in Week 12. Hill finished the 2020 season with 87 receptions for 1,276 receiving yards and 15 receiving touchdowns to go along with two rushing touchdowns. He earned a fifth career nomination to the Pro Bowl and was named as a First-team All-Pro for the third time. He was ranked 15th by his fellow players on the NFL Top 100 Players of 2021.

In the Divisional Round of the playoffs against the Cleveland Browns, Hill recorded eight catches for 110 yards, including a five-yard catch on 4th and 1 late in the fourth quarter to secure a 22–17 win for the Chiefs. In the Chiefs 38–24 victory in the AFC Championship over the Buffalo Bills, Hill recorded nine catches for 172 yards, including a 71-yard reception. He recorded seven catches for 73 yards in the Chiefs 31–9 loss in Super Bowl LV against the Buccaneers.

 2021 

Hill started the 2021 season strong with 11 receptions for 197 yards and a touchdown in the 33–29 victory over the Cleveland Browns. In Week 4, a 42–30 victory over the Philadelphia Eagles, he had 11 receptions for 186 receiving yards and three touchdowns. He added a third-game with double-digit receptions with 12 for 94 yards and a touchdown against the New York Giants in Week 8. In Week 15, against the Los Angeles Chargers, he had 12 receptions for 148 yards and a touchdown, his fourth game in the 2021 season with at least 11 receptions. Hill was put on the Reserve/COVID-19 list on December 21, 2021. He was activated on December 25, 2021. In the Chiefs Week 17 game against the Cincinnati Bengals, he broke the Chiefs franchise record for receptions in a season, which was broken the previous year by his teammate Travis Kelce. He finished the 2021 season with 111 receptions for 1,239 receiving yards and nine receiving touchdowns. He earned a sixth consecutive nomination to the Pro Bowl.

In the Wild Card Round of the playoffs, Hill scored a touchdown in the 42–21 victory over the Pittsburgh Steelers. In the Divisional Round against the Buffalo Bills, he had 11 receptions for 150 yards and a touchdown in the 42–36 overtime win. In the back-and-forth fourth quarter of the game, Hill caught a 64-yard touchdown pass from Mahomes as part of the sequence at the end of the game. In the AFC Championship against the Cincinnati Bengals, he had seven receptions for 78 yards and a touchdown (on the Chiefs' opening drive) in the 27–24 overtime loss. He was targeted by Mahomes on the Chiefs' last offensive play, but the ball was tipped by Safety Jessie Bates into the hands of Vonn Bell. 

 Miami Dolphins 
On March 23, 2022, the Chiefs traded Hill to the Miami Dolphins in exchange for a 2022 first-round pick, a 2022 second-round pick, two fourth-round picks, and a 2023 sixth-round pick. After the trade was completed, Hill signed a four-year, $120 million extension. This includes $72.2 million guaranteed, making him the highest-paid wide receiver in the NFL.

 2022 

Hill made his Dolphins debut against the New England Patriots in Week 1, catching eight passes for 94 yards in the 20–7 win. The next week against the Baltimore Ravens, Hill caught 11 passes for 190 yards and two touchdowns in the 42–38 comeback win. In Week 4, against the Cincinnati Bengals, he had 160 yards in the 27–15 loss. In Week 6, against the Minnesota Vikings, he had 177 receiving yards in the 24–16 loss. In Week 8 against the Detroit Lions, Hill had 12 catches for 188 receiving yards in the 31–27 victory.

Hill finished the year with career highs in receptions and receiving yards with 119 and 1,710 and helped the Dolphins to a playoff berth before losing to the Buffalo Bills in the wildcard 34-31.

 NFL career statistics 

 Regular season 

 Postseason 

 Records Chiefs franchise records Receptions in a season (111, 2021)
 Receiving yards in a season (1,479, 2018)
 Touchdown receptions in a season (15, 2020, tied with Dwayne Bowe)Dolphins franchise records'
 Receptions in a season (119, 2022)
 Receiving yards in a season (1,710, 2022)

Coaching career 
Hill began coaching as an assistant coach at Lee's Summit North High School in 2020.

Personal life 
In September 2018, Hill and Crystal Espinal became engaged.

Legal issues

Domestic assault conviction 
Stillwater, Oklahoma police records indicate that on December 12, 2014, Hill was arrested on complaints of assault of his 20-year-old pregnant girlfriend, Crystal Espinal. The police report states that the two got into an argument and he threw her around "like a ragdoll", punched her in the face, sat on her and repeatedly punched her in the stomach, and choked her. Oklahoma State dismissed him from the football team after the charges.

Hill eventually pleaded guilty to domestic assault and battery by strangulation and was sentenced to three years of probation, an anger-management course, a year-long batterer's program, and was required to undergo a domestic-abuse evaluation, a sentence that Espinal was consulted about and said she was comfortable with. Espinal eventually gave birth to a boy.

Child abuse investigation 
In March 2019, Hill was investigated for alleged battery after an incident in which his three-year-old son sustained a broken arm. The following month, his son was placed into care temporarily as a result of an emergency hearing conducted by the Kansas Department of Children and Families. On April 24, the Johnson County District Attorney Steve Howe released a statement, saying that his office believed a crime had been committed but the evidence did not allow them to conclude the perpetrator, and that the Kansas Department of Children and Families continued to investigate. The following day, an audio recording of Hill and Espinal discussing the injury to their son and the subsequent investigation was released. In the recording that surfaced, Hill and his fiancée discuss their son's broken arm; she says that their son is scared of him, to which Hill responds, "You should be afraid of me too." As a result, the criminal investigation into Hill was re-opened. On June 7, prosecutors announced the case against Hill was inactive. On June 10, reports surfaced that medical investigations showed his son's arm was broken by accident and in a way that indicated it was broken bracing for a fall. On July 9, 2019, the full unedited audio from the recording was released. In the full audio, Hill accuses Espinal of lying about the domestic violence accusations in 2014 and about Hill breaking their son's arm. The NFL stated they have always had the full audio of the recording. On July 19, 2019, the NFL released a statement saying that Hill will not be suspended and that they found no evidence that Hill violated the personal conduct policy, but the incident will be re-examined if new evidence emerges.

References

External links 

 
 Miami Dolphins bio
 West Alabama Tigers bio

1994 births
Living people
African-American male track and field athletes
American Conference Pro Bowl players
American football running backs
American football wide receivers
American male sprinters
College men's track and field athletes in the United States
Garden City Broncbusters football players
Kansas City Chiefs players
Miami Dolphins players
Oklahoma State Cowboys football players
Oklahoma State Cowboys track and field athletes
People from Douglas, Georgia
Players of American football from Georgia (U.S. state)
West Alabama Tigers football players
American masters athletes